Fighter Squadron 3 or VF-3, was an aviation unit of the United States Navy. Originally established on 1 July 1922, it was disestablished in May 1924.

Operational history

See also
History of the United States Navy
List of inactive United States Navy aircraft squadrons
List of United States Navy aircraft squadrons

References

External links
http://www.tomcattersassociation.org/VF-31/vf-31.htm
http://www.history.navy.mil/nan/backissues/1950s/1959/apr59.pdf

Strike fighter squadrons of the United States Navy